Streptoglossa bubakii is a species of flowering plant in the family Asteraceae and grows in Queensland, Western Australia and the Northern Territory. It is an upright, aromatic perennial herb with pink, purplish-blue or red to brown flowers.

Description
The leaves and branches are strongly fragrant, sticky and covered with soft, weak, thin hairs to long, soft, straight hairs and thickly glandular. The stems are upright or ascending, leafy, older plants many branched and dense.

Taxonomy and naming
Streptoglossa bubakii was first described by Karel Domin as Pterigeron bubakii. In 1981 Clyde Robert Dunlop changed the name to Streptoglossa bubakii and the description was published in  Journal of the Adelaide Botanic Garden. The specific epithet (bubakii)  was named after the botanist František Bubák.

Distribution and habitat
This streptoglossa grows usually in areas near clay plains in Queensland, Western Australia and the Northern Territory.

References

Asterales of Australia
Flora of the Northern Territory
Flora of Western Australia
Flora of Queensland
bubakii